Sean Johnston is a Canadian writer, who won the ReLit Award for short fiction in 2003 for his short story collection A Day Does Not Go By.

He has also published the novels All This Town Remembers (2006) and Listen All You Bullets (2013), the poetry collections Bull Island (2004) and The Ditch Was Lit Like This (2011), and the short story collection We Don't Listen to Them (2014).

Originally from Asquith, Saskatchewan, he lives in Kelowna, British Columbia, where he teaches English at Okanagan College.

References

External links

Living people
21st-century Canadian novelists
21st-century Canadian poets
21st-century Canadian short story writers
Canadian male novelists
Canadian male poets
Canadian male short story writers
Writers from Saskatchewan
Writers from British Columbia
People from Kelowna
People from Asquith, Saskatchewan
21st-century Canadian male writers
Year of birth missing (living people)